Katsumi Kishino is an engineer at Sophia University in Tokyo, Japan. He was named a Fellow of the Institute of Electrical and Electronics Engineers (IEEE) in 2016 for his contributions to III-V light emitter technology.

References

Fellow Members of the IEEE
Living people
Academic staff of Sophia University
Japanese electrical engineers
Year of birth missing (living people)
Place of birth missing (living people)